The University of Calcutta, located in Kolkata, West Bengal, is one of the oldest and most renowned educational institutions in South Asia. It was established in 1857. There are several colleges and institutes that are affiliated to this university. At present, there are approximately 160 institutes which comes under this university, which are mostly located in the districts of Kolkata, Howrah, Hooghly, and South 24 Parganas.

List of affiliated colleges
This is the list of colleges in Kolkata.

Acharya Girish Chandra Bose College, Kolkata
Acharya Jagadish Chandra Bose College, Kolkata
Al Ameen Memorial Minority College, Baruipur
Anandamohan College, Kolkata, afternoon/evening college 
Asutosh College, day college 
Azad Hind Fouz Smriti Mahavidyalaya, Domjur
Bagnan College, Kolkata
Bangabasi College, Kolkata 
Bangabasi Evening College, Kolkata 
Bangabasi Morning College, Kolkata 
Bankim Sardar College, Tangrakhali, South 24 Parganas
Baruipur College, Baruipur, South 24 Parganas 
Basanti Devi College, Kolkata 
Behala College, Kolkata 
Bengal Music College, Kolkata 
Bethune College, Kolkata 
Bhangar Mahavidyalaya, Bhangar, South 24 Parganas 
Bhawanipur Education Society College, Kolkata 
Bidhan Chandra College, Rishra, Rishra
Bijoy Krishna Girls' College, Howrah
Bikash Bharati Law College, Joyrampur
Budge Budge College, Budge Budge, South 24 Parganas 
Calcutta Girls BT College, Kolkata 
Calcutta Girls' College, Kolkata  
Charuchandra College, Kolkata 
Chittaranjan College, Kolkata 
City College, Kolkata
City College of Commerce and Business Administration, Kolkata 
David Hare Training (IASE) College, Kolkata 
Debnarayan Shiksha Sansthan, Sonarpur
Deshbandhu College for Girls, Kolkata 
Dhola Mahavidyalaya, Dhola, South 24 Parganas 
Dhruba Chand Halder College, Kolkata 
Dinabandhu Andrews College, Garia, Kolkata 
Dinabandhu Institution, Howrah
Don Bosco College, Park Circus
Dr. Kanailal Bhattacharya College, Santragachi
EI-Bethel College, Rasapunja
Fakir Chand College, Diamond Harbour, South 24 Parganas
George School of Law, Konnagar, Hooghly
Gangabharpur Sikshan Mandir, Howrah
Gangadharpur Mahavidyamandir, Gangadharpur, Howrah
Goenka College of Commerce and Business Administration, Kolkata 
Gokhale Memorial Girls' College, Kolkata 
Gourmohan Sachin Mondal Mahavidyalaya, Bireswarpur
Government College of Art & Craft, Kolkata
Government Girls General Degree College, Ekbalpur, Kolkata 
Gurudas College, Kolkata 
Harimohan Ghose College, Kolkata 
Heramba Chandra College, Kolkata, day college 
Indian Institute of Social Welfare and Business Management, Kolkata 
Institute of Education for Women, Kolkata 
Institute of Jute Technology, Kolkata 
Jagdish Chandra Basu Sikshak Shikshan Mahavidyalaya, Kolkata 
Jaypur Panchanan Roy College, Howrah
Jibantala Rokeya Mahavidyalaya, Mallikati, South 24 Parganas 
Jogesh Chandra Chaudhuri College, Kolkata 
Jogesh Chandra Chaudhuri Law College, Kolkata 
Jogamaya Devi College, Kolkata, morning college for women
K. K. Das College, Kolkata 
Kamala Devi Sohanraj Singhvi Jain College of Education, Kolkata 
Khudiram Bose Central College, Kolkata 
Kidderpore College, Kidderpore
Kishore Bharati Bhagini Nivedita (Co-ed) College, Kolkata 
Kultali Dr. B .R. Ambedkar College, Kultali, South 24 Parganas 
Lady Brabourne College, Kolkata 
Lalbaba College, Howrah
L.J.D. College, Punnyahat, PO Saharahat, South 24 Parganas
Loreto College, Kolkata
Magrahat College, Magrahat, South 24 Parganas 
Maharaja Manindra Chandra College, Kolkata, day college 
Maharaja Sris Chandra College, Kolkata, afternoon/ evening college 
Maharani Kasiswari College, Kolkata, morning college for women 
Maheshtala College, Kolkata 
Mahitosh Nandy Mahavidyalaya, Jangipara
Matiaburj College, Kolkata
Maulana Azad College, Kolkata 
Milli Al-Ameen College for Girls, Kolkata 
Muralidhar Girls' College, Kolkata 
Naba Ballygunge Mahavidyalaya, Kolkata
Nabagram Hiralal Paul College, Konnagar
Narasinha Dutt College, Howrah
Netaji Nagar College (Evening), Kolkata 
Netaji Nagar College for Women, Kolkata, morning college 
Netaji Nagar Day College, Kolkata
New Alipore College, Kolkata 
Panchla Mahavidyalaya, Howrah
Panchur College, South 24 Parganas
Parameswar Mahavidyalaya (B.Ed), South 24 Parganas
Patharpratima Mahavidyalaya, Patharpratima, South 24 Parganas
Prabhu Jagatbandhu College, Howrah
Prafulla Chandra College, Kolkata, afternoon/ evening college 
Puras-Kanpur Haridas Nandi Mahavidyalaya, Kolkata 
Rabin Mukherjee College, Kolkata
Rabindra Shiksha Sammilani Law College, Subhashgram, South 24 Parganas
Raidighi B Ed College, Raidighi
Raidighi College, Raidighi, South 24 Parganas 
Raja Peary Mohan College, Uttarpara
Ramakrishna Mission Blind Boys Academy, Narendrapur
Ramakrishna Mission Residential College, Narendrapur, South 24 Parganas 
Ramakrishna Mission Shikshanamandira, Belur, Howrah
Ramakrishna Mission Vidyamandira, Belur, Howrah
Rammohan College, Kolkata, morning college for women
Ramsaday College, Amta
Rani Birla Girls' College, Kolkata 
Seth Anandram Jaipuria College, Kolkata 
Sadhan Chandra Mahavidyalaya, Harindanga, South 24 Parganas 
Sagar Mahavidyalaya, Harinbari, South 24 Parganas 
Saheed Anurup Chandra Mahavidyalaya, Burul, South 24 Parganas 
Sammilani Mahavidyalaya, Kolkata 
Sammilani Teachers Training College, Barakhola
Sanskrit College, Kolkata 
Sarisa B.Ed College, South 24 Parganas 
Sarsuna College, Kolkata 
Savitri Girls' College, Kolkata 
Scottish Church College, Kolkata 
Sree Agrasain College, Liluah
Serampore College, Serampore
Serampore Girls' College, Serampore
Seth Soorajmull Jalan Girls' College, Kolkata
Shirakole Mahavidyalaya, Sirakol, South 24 Parganas
Shyambazar Law College, Kolkata
Sivanath Sastri College, Kolkata, morning college for women
Shri Shikshayatan College, Kolkata 
Sibani Mandal Mahavidyalaya, Namkhana, South 24 Parganas
Sir Gurudas Mahavidyalaya, Kolkata 
Sister Nibedita Government General Degree College for Girls
Sonarpur Mahavidyalaya, Kolkata 
South Calcutta Girls College, Kolkata 
South Calcutta Law College, Kolkata 
Sovarani Memorial College, Jagatballavpur
St. Paul's Cathedral Mission College, Kolkata 
St. Xavier's College, Kolkata
State Institute of Physical Education For Women, Kolkata 
Sukanta College, Bhangankhali, South 24 Parganas 
Sundarban Ashutosh B Ed College for Women, South 24 Parganas 
Sundarban Hazi Desarat College, Pathankhali, South 24 Parganas 
Sundarban Mahavidyalaya, Kakdwip, South 24 Parganas 
Surendranath College for Women, Kolkata 
Surendranath Evening College, Kolkata
Surendra Lal Das Teachers Training College, Ananda Nagar
Surendranath Law College, Kolkata 
Surendranath College, Kolkata 
Sushil Kar College, Champahati, South 24 Parganas
Swami Niswambalananda Girls' College, Bhadrakali
Syamaprasad College, Kolkata, afternoon/ evening college 
Shyampur Siddheswari Mahavidyalaya, Ajodhya
Taradevi Harakhchand Kankaria Jain College, Kolkata 
The Heritage College, Anandapur
Udaynarayanpur Madhabilata Mahavidyalaya, Udaynarayanpur
Uluberia College, Uluberia
Umes Chandra College, Kolkata
Vedanta College, Phoolbagan
Victoria Institution (College), Kolkata 
Vidyanagar College, Charashyamdas
Vidyasagar College for Women, Kolkata 
Vidyasagar College, Kolkata
Vidyasagar Evening College, Kolkata 
Vidyasagar Mahavidyalaya, Masat
Viharilal College for Home and Social Science, Kolkata 
Vijaygarh Jyotish Ray College, Kolkata 
Vivekananda College for Women, Kolkata 
Vivekananda College, Thakurpukur, Kolkata
Women's Christian College, Kolkata 
Women's College, Kolkata

References

External links
 

University of Calcutta affiliates
Academic institutions associated with the Bengal Renaissance

Calcutta